Rayhaan Rahim Amari Tulloch (born 20 January 2001) is an English professional footballer who plays as a forward for Dundalk on loan from West Bromwich Albion.

Club career
Tulloch made his professional debut for West Brom on 26 January 2019, coming on in the 81st minute for Wes Hoolahan in a 0–0 draw with Brighton & Hove Albion in the fourth round of the FA Cup. Tulloch made his second West Brom appearance in the FA Cup fourth round replay at home to Brighton on 6 February 2019, coming on for Jake Livermore in the 63rd minute of a 1–3 defeat.

On 11 September 2020, Tulloch joined League One club Doncaster Rovers on a season-long loan deal, reuniting with former manager Darren Moore. On his second appearance for Doncaster, he suffered a serious hamstring injury which would see the loan terminated early.

On 8 August 2022, Tulloch joined Rochdale on a season-long loan.

International career
In May 2018, Tulloch was a member of the England under-17 squad as they hosted the 2018 UEFA European Under-17 Championship. He started in the semi-final defeat against the Netherlands. In May 2019, Tulloch was included in the England U18s squad for the Slovakia Cup.

Career statistics

References

External links

Rayhaan Tulloch Player Profile on the West Bromwich Albion F.C. website

2001 births
Living people
English footballers
England youth international footballers
Association football forwards
West Bromwich Albion F.C. players
Doncaster Rovers F.C. players
Rochdale A.F.C. players
Dundalk F.C. players
League of Ireland players
Black British sportspeople
Footballers from Birmingham, West Midlands
Expatriate association footballers in the Republic of Ireland